Church bells are bells rung from churches.

Church Bells may also refer to:

"Church Bells", comedy song by Smothers Brothers from Curb Your Tongue, Knave!
"Church Bells" (song), song by Carrie Underwood

See also
"The Church Bells of Konevets" a Karelian folk song, best known as the 1975 recording of Finnish music group Piirpauke